The 1994–95 Atlas F.C. season is the 65th season in the football club's history and the 25th consecutive season in the top flight of Mexican football.

Squad

Transfers

Winter

Competitions

La Liga

League table

Group 1

General table

Results by round

Matches

References

External links

1994–95 Mexican Primera División season
1994–95 in Mexican football